The 1944 season of the Paraguayan Primera División, the top category of Paraguayan football, was played by 10 teams. The national champions were Cerro Porteño.

Results

Standings

Second-place play-off

External links
Paraguay 1944 season at RSSSF

Para
Paraguayan Primera División seasons
Primera